Robert Peter Paul Kilger (June 29, 1944 – November 29, 2021) was a Canadian politician.

Born in Cornwall, Ontario, Kilger was the former Liberal member of Parliament for the Cornwall region, representing the riding Stormont—Dundas—South Glengarry from 2000 to 2004, and Stormont—Dundas from 1988 to 2000. He was Chief Government Whip, and Deputy Speaker and Chairman of Committees of the Whole of the House of Commons.

He lost his seat in the 2004 election to Conservative candidate Guy Lauzon. Prior to his political life, he was a businessman and coached the Cornwall Royals to a Memorial Cup victory in 1981. He also was a referee in the NHL. His son was former National Hockey League forward Chad Kilger.

Kilger was elected Mayor of the City of Cornwall on November 13, 2006 with 49.4% of the popular vote. He was re-elected on October 25, 2010. On October 27, 2014, Kilger lost the 2014 mayoral race to Leslie O'Shaughnessy by nearly 1000 votes. He died on November 29, 2021, at the age of 77, from cancer, which he was first diagnosed with 11 years prior.

References

External links
 
 Bob Kilger Official Website

1944 births
2021 deaths
21st-century Canadian politicians
Cornwall Royals (OHL) coaches
Cornwall Royals (QMJHL) coaches
Liberal Party of Canada MPs
Mayors of Cornwall, Ontario
Members of the House of Commons of Canada from Ontario
National Hockey League officials
Oshawa Generals players